The mixed team competition of the 2022 European Aquatics Championships was be held on 21 August.

Results
The race was started at 16:00.

References

2022 European Aquatics Championships